An Imperfection is a 2015 Sri Lankan Canadian drama, thriller film directed by Rasanga Weerasinghe and co-produced by Rasanga Weerasinghe, Eranga Hemajith, Rama Jabri, and Jon Suk. It stars Erin Keller, Jaylee Hamidi, and Michael Ian Farrell. Music co-composed by Jonathan George and Sean Sansoni.

Plot
A young woman begins dating after a life-changing journey and she instantly connects with a man. Their bliss is cut short when the couple are attacked by a vicious gang, and their imperfections are revealed.

Cast
 Erin Keller as Kamara
 Jaylee Hamidi as Becky
 Michael Ian Farrell as Irish Thug
 Sean Behnsen as Naughty
 Christoph Koniczek as Skinner
 Peter John Berry as Bad
 Chris Mackie as Irish Thug 
 Nick Thorp as Vincent

Production 
The film was produced with a shoe string budget of C$ 3,000 and shot over six days in Victoria, British Columbia. It was partially improvised: the script was only 55 pages. The filmmakers were inspired by the Guerrilla filmmaking approaches of filmmakers such as Thomas Vinterberg, Gareth Edwards, Joe Swanberg, and John Cassavetes.

Accolades and screenings
An Imperfection was premiered at Goethe-Institut Film Forum  (Colombo) in 2015 and the event was moderated by the veteran filmmaker Anomaa Raajakaruna, Boodee Keerthisena and Author Kaushalya Kumarasinghe. Subsequently, it was also premiered in Canada at the Victoria Event Centre (British Columbia) in 2015 with a panel discussion with the cast and the director. An Imperfection was nominated for Best debut film at the Jaffna International Film Festival in 2016. It was also nominated for Best Film on Human Rights category at the International Open Film Festival (IOFF) in 2016. It was later screened at the Fandependent Film Festival.

References

External links
 

Canadian thriller drama films
English-language Canadian films
2015 films
Sri Lankan thriller drama films
2010s English-language films
2010s Canadian films